Noblella madreselva is a species of frog in the family Strabomantidae. The species is only known from its type locality, Madre Selva in the La Convención Province, Cusco, Peru.

Etymology
The specific name, madreselva, translates to "mother jungle" in Spanish. It honors the efforts of local conservation initiatives, such as the local ecotourism lodge Madre Selva.

Description
The holotype, an adult male, measures  in snout–vent length, while the paratype, an adult female, measures . The snout is short and rounded, bluntly so in lateral view. The tympanic annulus is barely visible. The fingers and toes have narrow lateral fringes. The fingers have rounded tips while the toe tips are weakly acuminate. The dorsal coloration is tan to dull brown, with or without dark brown markings. Some specimens have diffuse brown suprainguinal stripes. The venter (the chest and belly) has a prominent white mark on a black background. The ventral surfaces of the limbs are red with small white spots.

Habitat and conservation
It is largely terrestrial and has been spotted under rocks, logs, and in the leaf litter during the day. Like its closest relatives, it is likely to direct development (i.e., there is no free-living larval stage).

Noblella madreselva is threatened by habitat loss and modification associated with agricultural activities in the region. It is not known to occur in any protected areas. However, the region of its type locality is partially protected by various reserves.

References

madreselva
Amphibians of Peru
Endemic fauna of Peru
Amphibians described in 2015
Taxa named by Alessandro Catenazzi